Four Arches is a 63-foot-tall steel sculpture by Alexander Calder, installed in Los Angeles, California. The sculpture was completed in 1973–1974.

References

1970s establishments in California
1970s sculptures
Bunker Hill, Los Angeles
Outdoor sculptures in Greater Los Angeles
Sculptures by Alexander Calder
Steel sculptures in California